Woodleigh School may refer to:
Woodleigh School, North Yorkshire, England
Woodleigh School, Melbourne, Australia
Woodleigh School, New Zealand